Peter Lee is a Chinese film director.

Early life
Peter Lee was born in Hong Kong in 1963 and immigrated to the United States in 1974. There, he attended New York University from 1982 to 1984, studying film. He later returned to Hong Kong.

Film career
Peter Lee worked in various capacities with director Ang Lee, whom he knew as a fellow student at New York University. He played a role in his directorial debut Pushing Hands and then in several of Lee's other projects. Between 1995 and 1999, Peter Lee worked in Taiwan television.

Lee's 2017 film Love is a Broadway Hit stars Godfrey Gao, Wang Likun, Wang Chuanjun, Li Yuan (李媛) and Naren Weiss.

Filmography

References

External links
  [Hong Kong Film Directors]

Chinese film directors
New York University alumni
Living people
Year of birth missing (living people)